Spark is a surname. Notable people with the surname include:

Alex Spark (1949–1993), Scottish footballer
Alexander Brodie Spark (1792–1856), Scottish-born Australian merchant
Debra Spark (born 1962), American writer
Jeany Spark (born 1982), British actress
Muriel Spark (1918–2006), Scottish novelist
Nick T. Spark, American film-maker and writer